Canton El Tablón belonged to the Municipality of Suchitoto, Cuscatlan, El Salvador. El Tablón was one of many cantons in the surrounding area that was flooded as a result of the Cerron Grande Hydroelectric Dam built in El Salvador between 1972-1976 that created the artificial Lake Suchitlán. According to former residents of El Tablon, the area was divided up into four main wikt:caseríos or hamlets, Caserio La Hacienda Vieja, Caserio Los Figueroas, Caserio Valle El Tablón, and Caserio Los Palitos. It is unclear where the name El Tablon originated from, but according to local historians, an aldea or village/hamlet of El Tablón existed prior to 1860 that was formed through a municipal ejido. An ejido was commonly owned municipal land granted by the Spanish Crown to governing bodies in the Spanish Empire. These lands were considered vacant or unused land in some cases belonging to existing indigenous communities.

History

The Barca of Rio Lempa 
According to various first-hand accounts, the Barca del Rio Lempa was a boating transportation system that would transport people and goods across the Rio Lempa between the Departments of Cuscatlan and Chalatenango. In previous decades, the shortest way to go from Chalatenango to the capital city of San Salvador, residents would use the San Francisco Lempa road that would take them to the Rio Lempa where they would cross from Canton Los Zepedas, in the municipality of San Francisco Lempa, Chalatenango to Canton El Tablon, in the municipality of Suchitoto, Cuscatlan. The location of the boat crossing was about 13 kilometres from the city of Chalatenango, in the Department with the same name, and about 10 kilometres northeast of the city of Suchitoto, Cuscatlan.

In the early 20th century, a large number of people were transported across the Rio Lempa on a daily basis. It became an essential part of the local economy and the tourism industry of both departments. As a result of this high usage, the departmental governments of Chalatenango and Cuscatlan agreed to build a suspension bridge named Cayetano Bosque that was destroyed by a severe storm in 1934. That same year, the municipality of San Francisco Lempa decided to build a boat that would be able to transport people and good across the Rio Lempa as the demand was still very high. That first boat was named Tablon Cayetano Bosque. It was used to not only transport people and goods but also vehicles such as local buses that traveled between the city of Chalatenango and the city of San Salvador. The initiative to build and use these boats as transportation was headed by Don Teodulo Zepeda, son of General Juan Orlando Zepeda. Don Teodulo Zepeda became the administrator of the first boat. These boats were built of wood with a lifespan of at least five years. According to some former users of the transportation system, the boat was susceptible to sinking when there was too much weight on top and would occur most often when transporting buses. To address this issue, the boat was attached to a cable above the boat that crossed the river and was attached to the shorelines.  At some point after the construction of the Tablon Cayetano Bosque bridge, another bridge was built across the Rio Lempa known by locals as Puente Remolino that was also destroyed not long after its construction by another severe storm. These bridges were never rebuilt and so the Barca del Rio Lempa continued to be of great use for local residents of the area until 1976 when the Cerron Grande Hydroelectric Dam was fully built and the lands surround the river in the Paraiso Basin were flooded.

Communications in Canton El Tablon

Education in Canton El Tablon

Diaspora, Internal Displacement & the Construction of the Cerron Grande Hydroelectric Dam 
What is known today as Lake Suchitlán, a man-made lake, was formed in the mid-1970s as a result of the Cerron Grande Hydroelectric Dam construction. It was named Lago Suchitlán by the now deceased local Alejandro Coto after Municipality of Suchitoto and the Department of Cuscatlan. It was a project initiated by the central federal government of El Salvador to produce hydro electricity for the country. As a result of the flooding associated with the project, 13,339 people were internally displaced from their family homes and lands in the Paraiso Basin of El Salvador, with around 9,000 people relocating to other communities and the rest receiving a small lump sum of money for their properties. The project affected four Departments, 1.Chalatenango, 2.Cuscatlan, 3.San Salvador, and 4.Cabanas, with the Department of Chalatenango seeing the most municipalities affected including Tejutla, El Paraiso, San Rafael, Santa Rita, Chalatenango, Azacualpa, San Francisco Lempa, San Luis del Carmen, and Potonico; San Salvador seeing the municipality of El Paisnal affected, and Cuscatlan seeing the municipality of Suchitoto affected.

The project was initiated on August 4, 1972 by the newly elected government of former President Arturo Armando Molina who had discussed the project as part of his government's platform. The project was to create a dam on the Rio Lempa where two Francis turbines, with a capacity to produce 67.5 MW each, would be constructed as additions to the two turbine system already built on the Rio Guajoyo and Rio Lempa. The project was advertised as the best resource for the country's energy problem, and was to be built 22 kilometres upstream from the Central dam on the Rio Lempa, between the municipality of Potonico, Chalatenango and Jutiapa, Cabanas. As a result of this construction, 2,180 million cubic metres of water flooded an area of around 13,500 hectares of land and formed the 135 kilometres squared artificial lake called Lago Suchitlán. As a result of the lake, 24+ archaeological sites were flooded and multiple cantons and caserios or hamlets disappeared. In Suchitoto, only two cantons disappeared, Canton El Tablon, and Canton San Juan.

The displacement of such a huge population had severe effects on the way of life for thousands of Salvadorians. In Canton El Tablon, there was a population of an estimated 2000 people at the time of the llena or "filling," as described by former residents of the affected areas. The lleno literally means filling in Spanish and refers to the filling of water or flooding of the Basin. Many displaced peoples from the cantons in Chalatenango, were relocated by the federal government to three newly built reurbanicaciones, or residential communities. These Reurbanicaciones are located in the Department of Chalatenango and are called Reurbanicacion Nucleo #1 "Areneros," Reurbanicacion Nucleo #2, and Reurbanicacion #3.

Cerron Grande Archaeological Salvage Project

Geography 
El Tablón was located adjacent to the Rio Lempa and had a stream and a seasonal river crossing through the area named Quebrada El Pacun and Rio Tacanagua.

Caserio Hacienda Vieja

Caserio Los Figueroas

Caserio Valle El Tablón

Caserio Los Palitos

Former Customs & Rituals

References

Former populated places in El Salvador
Underwater archaeological sites
Cuscatlán Department